CanAm Highway  is an international highway that connects Mexico to Canada through the United States. It travels along U.S. Route 85 (US 85) and Interstate 25 (I-25), passing through six U.S. states (Texas, New Mexico, Colorado, Wyoming, South Dakota, North Dakota) and the Canadian province of Saskatchewan.  The CanAm highway in Canada comprises  Saskatchewan Highway 35 (SK 35), SK 39, SK 6, SK 3, and SK 2.  The route continues south in Mexico as Mexican Federal Highway 45 (Fed. 45), and north in Canada as SK 102 but are not labeled the CanAm highway.

History
The CanAm highway was a concept begun in the 1920s.

Route description

It continues north on SK 35 to  Weyburn, Saskatchewan, where it switches to SK 39. Then it runs north to Corinne where it continues on SK 6 until Melfort. There it changes highways again, this time to follow SK 3. That carries the CanAm Highway to  Prince Albert where it continues on SK 2. The northern end is at La Ronge.

See also

 CANAMEX Corridor
 Pan-American Highway
 NAFTA superhighway

References

External links

Saskatchewan Highways Website

CanAm
Interstate 25
U.S. Route 85